Franck Mawuena (born November 21, 1992 in Lomé) is a Togolese football striker playing currently for Beerschot in Belgium.

References

1992 births
Living people
Togolese footballers
Süper Lig players
Belgian Pro League players
Gençlerbirliği S.K. footballers
Beerschot A.C. players
Togolese expatriate footballers
Expatriate footballers in Belgium
Expatriate footballers in Turkey
Association football forwards
21st-century Togolese people